Mustafa Sali Karadayi (born 8 May 1970 in Borino, Bulgaria) is a Turkish-Bulgarian politician and current Chairman of the Movement for Rights and Freedoms (MRF).

Personal life
Mustafa Karadayi is married and has two children.

He graduated from the University of National and World Economy in Sofia, Bulgaria.

His nickname is Saker Falcon.

Academic career
From 1996 to 2001 he was a professor of Informatics at New Bulgarian University.

Political career
He is the founder of the Academic Society of MFR in Sofia and a member of the MRF since May 1991. He founded the youth wing of MRF and chaired it from 1998 to 2003.
From 2002 to 2010 he was deputy executive director of the Agency for Post-Privatization Control.

Secretary of the Central Election Commission IPVR- 2001 mini- '03, the IPVR- '06, the '07 ICHEP-, the mini- '07, the '09 ICHEP-, the Institute for National Remembrance - '09, and Article of '05, the INP-

Since 2010, Karadayi was the organizational secretary of the Central Operative Bureau (COB) MRF.

Karadayi was elected to the Bulgarian parliament in 2013.

Since 24 December 2015 he was one of three co-chairs of the interim MRF to IX National Conference of the party after Lyutvi Mestan was expelled.

Chairman of the Movement for Rights and Freedoms
On 24 April 2016 he was unanimously elected chairman of the MRF by the IX National Conference of the party.

References

1970 births
Living people
Members of the National Assembly (Bulgaria)
Bulgarian people of Turkish descent
Movement for Rights and Freedoms politicians
Bulgarian Muslims
University of National and World Economy alumni
People from Smolyan Province